Cuxwold is a village in the civil parish of Swallow, in the West Lindsey district of Lincolnshire, England.

Cuxwold Grade II* listed Anglican church is dedicated to St Nicholas. The church, of 11th-century origin but with an incorporated earlier Saxon tower arch, was considerably restored and rebuilt in 1860 by James Fowler. The restoration was carried-out under instruction from Henry Thorold, who, in the 1870s, added a monument to his family within the church. Within the village is a further Grade II listed building, Cuxwold Hall, built in 1860.

Cuxwold was the location of an emergency landing ground for airplanes during the Second World War and is now the home of  Grimsby Airfield.

References

External links

"Cuxwold", genuki.org.uk. Retrieved 21 July 2011

Villages in Lincolnshire
Hamlets in Lincolnshire
West Lindsey District